Leon Amos Schreiber is a South African author and Democratic Alliance (DA) politician serving as the Shadow Minister of Public Service and Administration since June 2019. He has been a Member of the National Assembly of South Africa since May 2019.

Early life and education
Schreiber was born on 11 September 1988 in the Namaqualand region of the former Cape Province. He attended Paul Roos Gymnasium in Stellenbosch and matriculated from the school in 2006. He studied at the University of Stellenbosch where he graduated with a bachelor's degree in International Studies, a BA Honours in political science and then a master's degree in the same subject.

In 2015, he received his PhD in political science from the Free University of Berlin.

Career
In 2015, Schreiber joined Princeton University as a Senior Research Specialist. He wrote the book Coalition Country: South Africa After the ANC, which was published in 2018.

Parliamentarian (2019–present)
He joined the DA and was a candidate for the party at the 2019 general election. He was placed 8th on the party's regional list and 42nd on the provincial list. As a result of the DA's electoral performance, he was elected as a Member of Parliament. Schreiber was sworn in on 22 May 2019. He later became the party's Stellenbosch constituency chair.

On 5 June 2019, Schreiber was appointed as the Shadow Minister of Public Service and Administration by the Democratic Alliance leader, Mmusi Maimane. As of June 2019, he serves a member of the Portfolio Committee on Public Service and Administration. He was an Alternate Member of the Ad Hoc Committee to Amend Section 25 of the Constitution until March 2020.

In October 2019, he resigned from Stellenbosch University's Institutional Forum with immediate effect due to English being elevated above Afrikaans as a teaching medium at the university. He said that he could not be privy to the phasing out of mother-tongue education in South Africa.

In November 2020, Schreiber called on the Auditor-General to probe parliament for spending millions of rands on aeroplane tickets for former cabinet ministers. On 5 December 2020, Schreiber was re-appointed to his Shadow Cabinet role by the newly elected DA leader, John Steenhuisen.

On 17 February 2021, Schreiber introduced the End Cadre Deployment Bill during the State of the Nation Address debate. If passed, it will prohibit anyone from being employed in public service, if they hold a political office.

In March 2021, Schreiber accused the Stellenbosch University management of being "anti-Afrikaans" after reports emerged that first-year students at some of the university's residences were allegedly prohibited from speaking Afrikaans. The DA subsequently launched a petition to protect mother tongue education.

On 7 April 2021, Schreiber was appointed to serve on the Committee for Section 194 Enquiry, which will determine if there are grounds for the removal of Busisiwe Mkhwebane as Public Protector.

During a briefing on Wednesday, 12 January 2022, Schreiber announced that the DA would submit a formal complaint to the Public Service Commission (PSC) based on a compilation of evidence, and request that the commission investigate each appointment revealed in the minutes of the ANC cadre deployment committee, which was published by the State Capture Commission in early-January 2022. Schreiber said that the DA's analysis of the minutes divulged that between May 2018 and May 2021 during Cyril Ramaphosa's presidency, the ANC's cadre deployment committee was involved in the appointment processes at a total of 88 state institutions. Schreiber also dismissed claims that cadre deployment ended when former president Jacob Zuma resigned as president in February 2018, saying it continues "unabated" during Ramaphosa's presidency.

References

External links

Dr Leon Amos Schreiber – Parliament of South Africa
Leon Schreiber – The Conversation

Living people
Year of birth missing (living people)
South African writers
Democratic Alliance (South Africa) politicians
Afrikaner people
People from Stellenbosch
Alumni of Paul Roos Gymnasium
Stellenbosch University alumni
Free University of Berlin alumni
Princeton University people
Politicians from the Western Cape
Members of the National Assembly of South Africa